The Peptidase-S11 RNA motif is a conserved RNA structure that was discovered by bioinformatics.
Peptidase-S11 motif RNAss are found in Enterobacteria.

Peptidase-S11 motif RNAs likely function as cis-regulatory elements, in view of their positions upstream of protein-coding genes. Indeed, virtually all Peptidase-S11 RNAs are located upstream of genes that encode peptidase S11, and are close to the start codon of that gene.

References

Non-coding RNA